R405 road  may refer to:
 R405 road (Ireland)
 R405 road (South Africa)